Cameron Arthur Mathison (born August 25, 1969) is a Canadian-American actor and television host. From 1997 to 2011, he played the role of Ryan Lavery on All My Children.

Early life and personal life
Mathison was born on August 25, 1969, in Sarnia, Ontario, Canada, the second of two sons of parents Bill and Loretta. Mathison attended Thornlea Secondary School in Thornhill, Ontario and McGill University in Montreal, Quebec. He graduated in 1993 with a bachelor's degree in Civil Engineering.

On July 27, 2002, he married model Vanessa Marie Arevalo, having proposed in Vail, Colorado. They have a son, Lucas (b. April 20, 2003), and a daughter, Leila (b. July 7, 2006).

On September 9, 2019, he announced that he had been diagnosed with renal cell carcinoma and would be taking several weeks off to receive treatment.

Career
After graduating from McGill, he began working as a model and started acting in commercials in Canada, the U.S. and Europe. This led to taking acting classes and the beginning of his acting career in Toronto.

Mathison made his feature film debut in 54. He followed up this appearance with a leading role in the Canadian independent movie Washed Up. About this time, December 1997, he was hired to play the role of Ryan Lavery on  All My Children filming his first scenes on December 15. Mathison first appeared on-screen in the January 12, 1998 episode.

Mathison won the Soap Opera Digest Award for Outstanding Male Newcomer in 1999 and earned Daytime Emmy Award nominations for Outstanding Supporting Actor in 2002 and 2005. In 2000, Mathison was named by People magazine as one of "America's 100 Most Eligible Bachelors".

In 2007, Cameron was on season five of Dancing with the Stars where he placed 5th with pro Edyta Śliwińska.

After working freelance with Good Morning America for several years, Mathison signed with GMA in January 2009 as a regular correspondent.  Mathison worked on many events for GMA: The Oscars, Grammys, Golden Globes, American Music Awards, MTV Movie Awards, MTV Video Music Awards, and the Country Music Awards. Mathison continued to work as a host and correspondent for GMA, the Emmy-nominated series Ultimate Proposal, and the renovation reality show Game of Homes.

Mathison also continues to act in both comedic and dramatic roles. He has appeared on Castle, Desperate Housewives, Hot in Cleveland, Drop Dead Diva, the EXes, and numerous independent and television movies. In 2014, Mathison joined the Hallmark/Crown Media family. Mathison signed on to appear in 9 movies based on the Murder She Baked novels starring opposite Alison Sweeney.

In April 2015, Mathison signed with CBS's Entertainment Tonight.  He is currently serving as a full-time correspondent and weekend co-anchor for the entertainment newsmagazine. On July 26, 2018, Mathison was named the new co-host of Home & Family, alongside Debbie Matenopoulos; he assumed his position in September with the launch of the seventh season.

In April 2021, Deadline Hollywood announced Mathison had joined the cast of General Hospital as Drew Cain. He debuted in the role in the final moments of the August 16, 2021 episode.

Filmography

Films

Television

Web

References

External links

1969 births
20th-century Canadian male actors
21st-century Canadian male actors
Canadian engineers
Canadian expatriate male actors in the United States
Canadian male film actors
Canadian male television actors
Canadian male soap opera actors
Canadian people of Norwegian descent
Living people
Male actors from Ontario
McGill University Faculty of Engineering alumni
Participants in Canadian reality television series
People from Sarnia